Pseudoporopterus simulator is a species of weevils belonging to the family Curculionidae.

References 

 Katsura Morimoto ON THE GENERA OF ORIENTAL CRYPTORHYNCHINAE (COLEOPTERA : CURCULIONIDAE) Esakia 11: 121-143 (1978)